Norra Vram is a village in Bjuv Municipality in southern Sweden. The 1933 Swedish Summer Grand Prix was held there.

Populated places in Skåne County